USS Gettysburg (CG-64) is a Ticonderoga-class guided-missile cruiser in the United States Navy. She is named for the Battle of Gettysburg during the American Civil War.

Construction
The third Gettysburg (CG-64) was laid down on 17 August 1988, at Bath, Maine, by Bath Iron Works; launched on 22 July 1989; sponsored by Julie Nixon Eisenhower, wife of Dwight D. Eisenhower II, grandson of former President Dwight D. Eisenhower and son-in-law of former President Richard M. Nixon; and commissioned on 22 June 1991, Captain John M. Langknecht in command.

Operation history
October 1992 - April 1993, maiden deployment to Mediterranean Sea in support of the  carrier battle group; along with sister ship .
On 30 November 1994, Gettysburg and guided missile frigate  were dispatched to assist the cruise ship , which was on fire in the Indian Ocean off the coast of Somalia. Achille Lauro eventually sank but the passengers were rescued and transported to Mombasa, Kenya.

On 13 October 1996, she bumped into Iranian corvette  in the northern Persian Gulf, however neither of the ships suffered serious damage

Gettysburg took part in Operation Desert Fox, 16-20 December 1998.

In March 2003, the ship was assigned to Cruiser-Destroyer Group Twelve.

Gettysburg, Captain Philip C. Davidson in command, and with a Sikorsky SH-60B Seahawk of Helicopter Antisubmarine Squadron Light (HSL) 46 Detachment 5 and a Coast Guard law enforcement detachment (LEDET) embarked, sailed from Naval Station Mayport, on a two-part counter narcotics deployment to the Western Caribbean and Eastern Pacific, 11 October–23 December 2005 and 1 January–4 April 2006. She visited Curaçao, Netherlands Antilles, 21-25 October, passed through the Panama Canal, 3-4 November, and provided air surveillance and evacuation support for a visit by President George W. Bush to Panama. In addition, the ship visited Vasco Nunez de Balboa, Panama, 18-22 November and 5–6 and 16–18 December. Gettysburg intercepted three narcotics smuggling vessels,  of cocaine, and 17 smugglers before the New Year.

The ship, with HSL-46 Detachment 5 and Coast Guard LEDET 409 embarked, intercepted MV Perseus V on 12 January 2006. The boarding team discovered a hidden compartment containing  of cocaine and detained 11 suspected smugglers.

The suspects sighted Gettysburg, set fire to their vessel, and abandoned ship in a skiff. The cruiser deployed two rigid hull inflatable boats (RHIBs) to battle the blaze, but the intense, fuel-fed flames overwhelmed Divi and she sank. The Americans took the eight crewmen into custody.

The Orion aggressively monitored the suspected vessel, preventing her from rendezvousing with a go-fast. Gettysburg meanwhile launched Cutlass 467, her Seahawk, which guided the ship toward William, but the suspects attempted to scuttle their boat. Gettysburgs rescue and assistance teams and LEDET 404 saved William, enabling her boarding team to recovery  of cocaine and apprehend the eight smugglers.

An Orion located a stealthy go-fast steaming westerly courses through a known drug-trafficking area on 11 March. Gettysburg closed and under cover of darkness, deployed LEDET 404 and a security team on board a RHIB, which boarded the suspected vessel, seizing  of cocaine,  of heroin, and detaining five smugglers. In addition, she sailed through the Panama Canal twice, 30-31 January and 15–16 March, and visited Cartagena, Colombia, 20-21 January, Vasco Nunez de Balboa, 16-19 February and 4-5 and 15–16 March, Curaçao, 23-26 March, and Port Everglades, Florida, 29 March-1 April. Additionally, she issued return-to-port orders to two Colombian-flagged vessels capable of providing logistics support to narcotics traffickers.

Amphibious assault ship , which operated as the afloat staging base for Combined Task Force (CTF) 151, coordinated the apprehension of six pirates in the Gulf of Aden on 20 March 2009. A skiff containing the suspects pursued Philippine-flagged MV Bison Express, which sent a distress call. Gettysburgs embarked SH-60B from HSL-46 spotted the pirates throwing objects overboard, and a visit, board, search, and seizure team from the cruiser seized the suspects, who were then transferred to Boxer for questioning.

CTF-151, Turkish Rear Admiral Caner Bener, in command, defeated a pirate attack in the Gulf of Aden on 13 May 2009. A Seahawk from HSL-46 Detachment 9, embarked on board Gettysburg, located a dhow suspected of serving as a “mother ship” for pirates. A visit, board, search, and seizure team and Coast Guard LEDET 409 from the cruiser discovered a variety of weapons on board the dhow and detained her 17 crewmembers. Gettysburg rescued another ship during her busy deployment when a Seahawk from the cruiser responded to Yemeni MV Alaseb and her 11 passengers, adrift in the Gulf of Aden on 26 May. The helo guided Gettysburg to the area, which towed Alaseb to a rendezvous with the Yemen Coast Guard for repairs.

The 13 May 2009, incident with MV Amira  was filmed and featured on the Spike TV network special U.S. Navy: Pirate Hunters.

Gettysburg completed her Composite Unit Training Exercise as part of Carrier Strike Group Two on 10 February 2011.  Gettysburg deployed with an embarked Helicopter Maritime Strike Squadron 70 (HSM-70) detachment as part of Carrier Strike Group Two, departing Naval Station Mayport on 10 May 2011.  Gettysburg subsequently participated in NATO naval exercise Exercise Saxon Warrior off the coast of England, under the operational control of Flag Officer Sea Training (FOST). During this exercise, Gettysburg operated with the new British guided-missile destroyer .

In May 2015, Gettysburg'''s homeport was changed from NAVSTA Mayport to Naval Station Norfolk, Virginia.

In popular culture
In Tom Clancy's novel The Bear and the Dragon, Gettysburg'' successfully defended Washington, D.C. against an incoming ICBM launched by the People's Democratic Republic of China using the Aegis missile system she carries.

Notes

External links
 
 Official web site 
 USS Gettysburg webpage

 

Ticonderoga-class cruisers
Ships built in Bath, Maine
1989 ships
Cruisers of the United States
Maritime incidents in 1996